José Luís "Wiso" Purcell Rodríguez, (December 1, 1914, Bayamón, Puerto Rico – February 6, 1996, San Juan, Puerto Rico) A former judge  in the Superior Court of Puerto Rico, founded the Puerto Rico Volleyball Federation.

He was one of the founders and first president of the Puerto Rican Volleyball Federation.  He was president of the Volleyball Federation from 1958 to 1962. He was a member of the 1966 Central American and Caribbean Games organizing committee.  He was a member and president of Phi Sigma Alpha fraternity.

Legacy
In 1986 he was inducted to the "Directorio Inmortale" of the Puerto Rican Sports Hall of Fame.

References

1914 births
1996 deaths
People from Bayamón, Puerto Rico
Puerto Rican sports executives and administrators
Puerto Rican judges